West Jessamine High School is a public high school in Nicholasville, Kentucky. It opened in 1997 along with East Jessamine High School after rapidly growing Jessamine County split its former high school, Jessamine County High, in two. West Jessamine inherited the former Jessamine County High's nickname of Colts.

Athletics
 Archery (coeducational)
 Baseball (boys only)
 Basketball (separate boys and girls)
 Bowling (separate boys and girls)
 Cheerleading squad (coeducational)
 Cross country team (coeducational, but boys and girls compete separately at the state level)
 Dance team
 Football (boys only)
 Golf (separate boys and girls)
 Rugby (coeducational)
 Soccer (separate boys and girls)
 Fastpitch softball (girls only)
 Tennis (separate boys and girls)
 Track (separate boys and girls)
 Volleyball (girls only)
 Swim Team (coeducational, but boys and girls compete separately at the state level)
 Wrestling (coeducational)
 marching-band (coeducational)

Academics

West Jessamine High School has the following academic departments:
 Agriculture
 Alternative
 Business
 Family and Consumer Science
 Fine Arts
 Fresh Start
 Language Arts
 Mathematics
 Physical Education
 Science
 Social Studies
 Special Education
 Technology Education
 World Languages

Extracurricular activities
West Jessamine's varsity football team has made a number of state playoffs appearances, most recently in 2005. The JV and freshman football teams have also had some recent success, going a combined 7-2 in the 2007 season. In the 2009 football season West Jessamine's football team went a record 9-3, most wins in school history, and won their first playoff game against Harrison County High School, but was defeated by Boyle County, who would later win the state championship.

The boys' varsity basketball team has made a number of state tournament appearances as well, including 2005's Sweet Sixteen run. In 2009 they made it to the Final Four in basketball. The boys' baseball, girls' softball, boys' and girls' soccer, and boys' and girls' track and cross country teams have all also achieved status among the better programs in the state; West Jessamine's two-state athletics championship came in girls' slow-pitch softball and girls' golf.

The West Jessamine girls' soccer team is under the head coaching of Kevin Wright.  Miss Kentucky Soccer 2010 was senior Arin Gilliland, who completed her career at West as a Parade All American and a member of the U20 National Team and several years on the Kentucky All-State team.  The Lady Colts made school history in the 2011 season by reaching the KHSAA Soccer Final Four, although they lost to the eventual state champion in the Final Four game.

The boys' golf team is arguably the school's most successful sports team in recent years, having won the State Championship in both 2012 and 2013.

The archery team is the only mixed-gender athletic program in the school. The team was re-established in the fall of 2012 after several years without funding. The team practices at the Providence Activity Center alongside the East Jessamine team, as both teams have the same coaches. West and East hosted 2013 pre-regional and the 2014 regional and pre-regional tournaments. West shot in the 2013 State, National, and World Tournaments, held in Louisville, Kentucky, and St. Louis, Missouri, respectively. The archery team is the only athletic team in West Jessamine's history to compete at a higher competition level than the state.

In the 2008 season, the boys' cross country team placed fourth in the state, only two points away from second place.  The track and field team has placed in the top five in the state each of the past five years, achieving state champions in the mile, two-mile, pole vault, and 4 by 800-meter relay.  The West Jessamine Baseball team has been successful in the past couple of years, most recently winning the district tournament and going on to win their first region championship, then advancing to state. The team was led by seniors Chase Greene who is now playing at the University of Kentucky, Joseph Griffitt now at Kentucky Wesleyan, Cody Stotts, and Scott Gross.

The chorus program at West Jessamine High School has a reputation as one of the best in the state of Kentucky, receiving distinguished ratings.  Elite voices in the chorus ensembles have represented West Jessamine High School at the Kentucky Governor's School for the Arts majoring in Vocal Music.  Three individuals have been selected in the past two years, two who attended as sophomores.

The band program at West Jessamine High School has received numerous "distinguished" ratings over the past several years. The band program consists of five major components - marching band, symphonic band, indoor percussion, pep band, and jazz band.
Marching Band
In 2004, the West Jessamine High School Marching Band, under the direction of Steven Page, placed 16th in Class 3A at the KMEA (Kentucky Music Education Association)State Marching Band Semifinals.
In 2005, with band director Steven Page, the marching band placed 8th, Distinguished rating, in the Class 4A KMEA State Marching Band Semifinals with their show "En La Oscuridad," which is translated as "Into the Darkness."  In spring 2006, while still under the direction of Steven Page, the concert band won the prestigious Dixie Classic music festival in the Overall Honor Group category, scoring higher than the bands competing in Virginia Beach from across the country.
In 2006, they placed 7th overall, Distinguished rating, in Class 4A KMEA State Marching Band Semifinals with their show "A Heart Divided",. They were under the direction of Rex Payton.
In 2007, the West Jessamine High School Marching Band placed 10th in Class 4A KMEA State Marching Band Semifinals with their show "Four".
Along with that, the band also received numerous best percussion awards and a few best color guard awards in their 2008 season in the Class 4A KMEA State Marching Band Semifinals with their show "Pulse." The show brought the band to 5th place in the Class 4A KMEA State Marching Band Semifinals, and just barely kept them out of state finals, with only two points between them and the fourth place band.
In 2009, under new band director, Michael White, the band performed "The Pursuit", in which they placed 5th, Distinguished rating, in the Class 4A KMEA State Marching Band Semifinals, falling short of making Finals by .09 points.
In 2010, the band performed the Show entitled "From the Ashes", under the direction of Michael White.  They earned 7th place, Distinguished rating, in the Class 4A KMEA State Marching Band Semifinals  and 4th Place Mid-States Class 3A Marching Band Championship.
In 2011, under the direction of Michael White, the West Jessamine Colts Band made school history by with their Class 4A KMEA State Marching Band Semifinals performance on October 29, 2011, at Barren County High School.  That performance earned them the title of a KMEA State Finalist, Distinguished rating, and sent them to the KMEA Finals Championship at Western Kentucky University that same evening.  The Colts finished in fourth place, thereby placing them as the 4th best high school marching band in the 4A division in the Commonwealth of Kentucky.  The program, entitled "One", was composed and choreographed by band director Michael White.  The 'story' looks at how each of us as an individual who can cause ripples and influence the whole world while our strength comes in our unity with each other. The show was innovative in two ways.  First, at every point during the performance, with the exclusion of the second movement where the whole band became a 'color guard', there was only one color guard performing.  Second, the band used iPads in three of the four pieces, with this technology use featured in the second movement.
In 2012, the band began facing difficulties. Due to increasingly low enrollment in the band, the marching band competed with only about 40-60 members, which is small for a band in their competing class. The band made an attempt at reaching out to the West Jessamine Middle School band for assistance in numbers. Today the band proudly combines both schools to compete in marching competitions, and still at a distinguished rating. 
In 2013 the band's enrollment began getting worse. One of the largest groups of seniors in band history graduated with the class of 2013, which strained the band. To keep from cutting the band program altogether, the Jessamine County Board of Education made the decision to cut the Jazz Band and Percussion Ensemble as extracurricular classes at the High School. This allowed for a larger number to be enrolled in band class instead of separating the band among separate classes. Due to a petition signed by angered parents, band alumni, and Jessamine County civilians, the Board of Education agreed to allow Jazz Band as a zero-block class, but the enrollment had to be no less than fifteen. It is unknown to date whether or not there was a success. Low enrollment also caused Director Michael White to offer the decision to do away with the competitive marching band. The band would still perform as the Pep Band at football and basketball games. The competitive marching band's future is currently unknown.
Drumline
The drumline brought home the silver medal from the Tri-State Indoor Drumline and Guard Circuit in the winter of 2006 in class Independent A with the show "High Octane."  In 2008, they set up an indoor drumline to train future marching band percussionists. The show was entitled "Paradox."

The school's Drama and Musical Theater program, under the theatrical direction of Edie Moon and Hallie Brinkerhoff and with assistance from the other arts departments at the high school, has performed plays and musicals such as Antigone, Wait Until Dark, Joseph and the Amazing Technicolor Dreamcoat, Fiddler on the Roof, The Real Inspector Hound, and The Crucible.In the fall of 2007, the high school performed the play On the Verge. Also, in the fall of 2006 the drama department entered Antigone into the yearly competition sponsored by the Kentucky Theater Association.The school's drama department won the "Best Newcomer" award.Out of all actors attending, three out of ten were chosen from West Jessamine High School as "most talented".

References

Educational institutions established in 1997
Public high schools in Kentucky
Schools in Jessamine County, Kentucky
1997 establishments in Kentucky
Nicholasville, Kentucky